PRX-07034 is a selective 5-HT6 receptor antagonist. It has cognition and memory-enhancing properties and potently decreases food intake and body weight in rodents. PRX-07034 was under development by Epix Pharmaceuticals for the treatment of obesity and cognitive impairment associated with Alzheimer's disease and schizophrenia but upon the company collapsing due to lack of funds the compound was auctioned to another corporation.

References

External links 
 Preclinical Data on Predix Pharmaceuticals' 5-HT6 Antagonist for Obesity and Cognitive...
 Epix’s Experimental Drug PRX-07034 Shows Potential Benefit on Cognition, Obesity

Phenylpiperazines
Anilines
Phenol ethers
Chloroarenes